Miguel Ángel Iglesias Guerrero (born 9 June 1961) is a Spanish former road cyclist, who competed as a professional from 1982 to 1992. He won the intermediate sprints classification in the Vuelta a España five times, between 1987 and 1991.

Major results

1982
 1st Overall Volta a Lleida
1983
 1st Stage 3 Vuelta a La Rioja
 3rd Trofeo Masferrer
 4th Subida al Naranco
1984
 2nd Clásica de Sabiñánigo
 3rd Trofeo Masferrer
 8th Overall Vuelta a Aragón
1985
 1st Torrejón-DYC
 3rd Overall Vuelta a Castilla y León
1st Stage 1
 4th Clásica de San Sebastián
1987
 1st  Intermediate sprints classification, Vuelta a España
 1st Stage 1 Vuelta a La Rioja
1988
 1st  Intermediate sprints classification, Vuelta a España
 1st Stage 4 Volta a Catalunya
 3rd Trofeo Masferrer
1989
 1st  Intermediate sprints classification, Vuelta a España
1990
 1st  Intermediate sprints classification, Vuelta a España
1991
 1st  Intermediate sprints classification, Vuelta a España

Grand Tour general classification results timeline

References

External links

1961 births
Living people
Spanish male cyclists
Cyclists from Catalonia
People from Alt Camp
Sportspeople from the Province of Tarragona
20th-century Spanish people